Andrei Gennadyevich Baranov (born 19 February 1962) is a former Russian football player.

References

1962 births
Living people
Soviet footballers
PFC CSKA Moscow players
FC Rubin Kazan players
Russian footballers
FC Luch Vladivostok players
Russian Premier League players
Sur SC players
Russian expatriate footballers
Expatriate footballers in Oman
FC Irtysh Omsk players
Association football defenders